Chopper Attack, known in Japan as , is a helicopter-based third-person shooter game for the Nintendo 64 released in 1997.

The game features numerous missions in various locations. Missions include bombing the enemy's bases, escorting Air Force One through dangerous jungle terrain, and rescuing prisoners of war. Every mission has a time limit.

Development
Chopper Attack was among the games demonstrated at the November 1996 Shoshinkai show. A two-player split screen mode was worked on, but eliminated by the time the game was released.

Reception

The game received mixed reviews according to the review aggregation website GameRankings. In Japan, however, Famitsu gave it a score of 30 out of 40. Nintendo Power gave the game 6.6/10, stating "Play control is a bit awkward, but if you work with it a bit, you'll get into the game."

Notes

References

External links
 

1997 video games
GT Interactive games
Helicopter video games
Midway video games
Nintendo 64 games
Nintendo 64-only games
Shoot 'em ups
SETA Corporation games
Video games developed in Japan